Summit Point Motorsports Park is a road racing and driver training facility located in Jefferson County, West Virginia about two hours west of Washington, D.C. in the state's Eastern Panhandle.

Current status
Summit Point Motorsports Park features three road racing circuits that are currently used for amateur automobile, motorcycle racing, and contracted government training.

History

Built in 1969–1970, Summit Point Motorsports Park (then "Summit Point Raceway"), opened in October 1969.

The first races held there were SCCA regional races in the fall of 1969 with IMSA International Sedans being the first professional event, later to become The Radial Tire Series, and IMSA Pro Formula Ford. The event was held on Memorial Day, May 30, 1970. (The holiday was still celebrated on the 30th then.)  Rasey Feezell won in an Alfa Romeo 4-door sedan, whose modifications were very questionable, taking home the grand sum of $200 prize money. Five of the eleven entrants were from Raleigh, North Carolina.

During its early years and since SCCA held numerous events at the track. Several Regional and National races were run each year. Many racers got their start in the popular SCCA Driver's Schools held there by the Washington DC Region.

Paul Newman ran several of his early races there in a Bob Sharp-prepared Datsun 510 sedan. He wished to be just another "racer" and did not want to be recognized at racing events as a "superstar", so he and wife Joanne Woodward kept to themselves and eschewed signing autographs. Few realized they were racing in the company of famous actors. The only outward clue was the plate on his 510's front bumper... "PLN"

Over time the track was host to a number of professional races sanctioned by IMSA and the SCCA Trans-Am Series through the late 1980s.

The track was sold to Bill Scott and his partner Tom Milner in the early 1980s. Bill was 1970 Formula Vee World Champion Bill Scott.

The Sportscar Vintage Racing Association is set to return to Summit Point in 2023 after a two-decade absence.

In addition to racing, the track became a training ground for various federal agencies and other security organizations.

Circuits

Summit Point Main

Summit Point Main is a 10-turn,  road course that features a  main straight. This original circuit opened in 1970.

The original layout did not include the "Carousel", presently denoted Turns 6 and 7.  In the original layout, Turn 5 was a ~90 deg. left-hander leading to a 90 deg. right-hander at the entry to what is now denoted Turn 8. Therefore, the original layout had 8 turns (or 9 depending on how you counted them). The "Carousel" wasn't added until sometime after mid-1973.

No longer used for professional auto races, it hosts many WKC, WKA, SCCA, Audi, Mazda Drivers, BMWCCA, NESBA, and NASA club races, track days, and schools.  In addition, motorcycle races are run by CCS and WERA, which also holds national-level 6-hour endurance race.

The Main Circuit is also the annual home of the Jefferson 500 vintage race and The 12 Hours at the Point endurance race.

The Main Circuit was repaved in the Fall of 2007.

Jefferson Circuit

The Jefferson Circuit is a seven-turn,  road course that was designed and built by Bill Scott as a dedicated course for high-performance, accident avoidance and emergency operation driver training. Opened in 1996 or 1997, the Jefferson is a course that demands constant attentiveness and smooth inputs from drivers.

The circuit hosts a number of driver training schools, as well as a handful of motorcycle trackdays each year.

The Jefferson Circuit is currently under construction with extensive upgrades, according to the track's website.

Shenandoah Circuit

The Shenandoah Circuit is a 22-turn,  road course that first opened in 2004. Widely considered one of the most technical circuits of the recent crop of race courses, the Shenandoah also boasts a smaller scale replica of the Nürburgring-Nordschleife's famous banked Karussell turn.  It's also known as the concrete jungle.

Since opening in late 2004, the Shenandoah has played host to a number of high-performance driver education clinics, a handful of road races and a number of motorcycle races. After a number of races and schools, minor changes were made to the track layout in late 2004 and early 2005, including the addition of a straight between turns 5 and 7.

Washington Circuit

The Washington Circuit is Summit Point's newest addition constructed and opened in 2009. 
 
Several layouts are used depending on the types of events occurring and the weather conditions, but the course is most often configured as the "Washington Long Course".

Lap records
The fastest official race lap records at Summit Point Motorsports Park are listed as:

References

External links
Official Site
Trackpedia guide to driving this track
Main Circuit track maps and hot lap description
Photos of the track from the 1970s

Buildings and structures in Jefferson County, West Virginia
Motorsport venues in West Virginia
IMSA GT Championship circuits
Tourist attractions in Jefferson County, West Virginia
Road courses in the United States